Qbox is an open-source software package for atomic-scale simulations of molecules, liquids and solids. It implements first principles (or ab initio) molecular dynamics, a simulation method in which inter-atomic forces are derived from quantum mechanics. Qbox is released under a GNU General Public License (GPL) with documentation provided at http://qboxcode.org. It is available as a FreeBSD port.

Main features
Born-Oppenheimer molecular dynamics in the  microcanonical(NVE) or canonical ensemble (NVT)
Car-Parrinello molecular dynamics
Constrained molecular dynamics for thermodynamic integration
Efficient computation of maximally localized Wannier functions
GGA and hybrid density functional approximations (LDA, PBE, SCAN, PBE0, B3LYP, HSE06, ...)
Electronic structure in the presence of a constant electric field
Computation of the electronic polarizability
Electronic response to arbitrary external potentials
Infrared and Raman spectroscopy

Methods and approximations
Qbox computes molecular dynamics trajectories of atoms using Newton's equations of motion, with forces derived from electronic structure calculations performed using Density Functional Theory. Simulations can be performed either within the Born-Oppenheimer approximation or using Car-Parrinello molecular dynamics. The electronic ground state is computed at each time step by solving the Kohn-Sham equations. Various levels of Density Functional Theory approximations can be used, including the local-density approximation (LDA), the generalized gradient approximation (GGA), or hybrid  functionals that incorporate a fraction of Hartree-Fock exchange energy. Electronic wave functions are expanded using the plane wave  basis set. The electron-ion interaction is represented by pseudopotentials.

Examples of use
Electronic properties of nanoparticles
Electronic properties of aqueous solutions
Free energy landscape of molecules
Infrared and Raman spectra of hydrogen at high pressure
Properties of solid-liquid interfaces

Code architecture and implementation
Qbox is written in C++ and implements parallelism using both the message passing interface (MPI) and the OpenMP application programming interface. It makes use of the BLAS, LAPACK, ScaLAPACK, FFTW and Apache Xerces libraries. Qbox was designed for operation on massively parallel computers such as the IBM Blue Gene supercomputer, or the Cray XC40 supercomputer. 
In 2006 it was used to establish a performance record on the BlueGene/L computer installed at the Lawrence Livermore National Laboratory.

Interface with other simulation software
The functionality of Qbox can be enhanced by coupling it with other simulation software using a client-server paradigm. Examples of Qbox coupled operation include:
Free energy computations: Coupled with the Software Suite for Advanced Ensemble Simulations (SSAGES).
Quasiparticle energy computations: Coupled with the WEST many-body perturbation software package.
Path integral quantum simulations: Coupled with the i-PI universal force engine.

See also 
 List of quantum chemistry and solid-state physics software
 Density Functional Theory

References

External links 
 
 

Computational chemistry software

Physics software
Free physics software